Andrew Powell (born January 19, 1976) is an American actor. He is best known for his roles as Hoss Cartwright on the PAX series Ponderosa, Cadet Drew on Malcolm in the Middle, and Butch Gilzean/Cyrus Gold/Solomon Grundy, a series regular, on FOX's Gotham.

Early life and education
Powell was born in Noblesville, Indiana and grew up in Lebanon, Indiana, graduating from Lebanon Senior High School.  He graduated from DePauw University in 1998 and moved to Los Angeles where he soon began auditioning for acting roles.

Career
His first television role was as a cadet on Fox's Malcolm in the Middle.  He appeared in thirteen episodes.  Soon after, he portrayed Hoss Cartwright on the series The Ponderosa, a prequel to Bonanza which premiered in 2001 on PAX. Powell has had guest appearances on many television shows including Psych, House, Leverage, ER, Cold Case, and Without a Trace. On Fox's Gotham he plays the recurring role of Butch Gilzean, chief enforcer for Fish Mooney (Jada Pinkett Smith).

He portrayed Bic in the 2011 film Straw Dogs, a remake of the 1971 film of the same name.  The remake was directed by Rod Lurie and starred James Marsden, Kate Bosworth, and Alexander Skarsgård.  It was released September 16, 2011.

Personal life
While shooting The Ponderosa in Australia, Powell met his wife, Veronica, who was a make-up artist on the show.  They have one son, born in 2011. They live in Los Angeles.

Filmography

References

External links

1976 births
Living people
Male actors from Indiana
American male film actors
American male television actors
DePauw University alumni
People from Noblesville, Indiana
People from Lebanon, Indiana